Ronald James Herbert "Ron" Wells (born 22 September 1935) is a former Australian politician.

He was born in Cardiff, New South Wales, to Cecil Wells, a businessman, and Mildred, née Tombs. He received a Higher Diploma in Accounting (Honours) from the University of Western Sydney in 1954, a Bachelor of Veterinary Science (Honours) from Sydney University in 1959, a PhD from Cambridge University in 1964, and a Master of Veterinary Science from Melbourne University in 1970. He served in the RAAF from 1955 to 1956 and worked as a veterinarian in 1960 before going to Cambridge. On his return in 1965 he was a foundation senior lecturer at the University of Melbourne's School of Veterinary Science, holding that position until 1985.

A member of the Liberal Party, Wells was elected to the Victorian Legislative Assembly in 1985 as the member for Dromana. He served until 1992, when he contested the Legislative Council seat of Eumemmerring instead. He was Opposition Spokesman on Higher Education from 1996 to 1999, when he retired from politics.

References

1935 births
Living people
Liberal Party of Australia members of the Parliament of Victoria
Members of the Victorian Legislative Assembly
Members of the Victorian Legislative Council
Members of the Victorian Legislative Council for Eumemmerring Province
Western Sydney University alumni
University of Sydney alumni
Alumni of the University of Cambridge
University of Melbourne alumni politicians